Predator X is a pliosaur assigned to Pliosaurus funkei.

Predator X may also refer to:

Predator X (Marvel Comics), a character from X-Men
Predator X (TV program), a television special on History